Claudia La Rocco is a poet, critic, and performer who works as a columnist for Artforum and writes about books and theater for The New York Times.

Education
La Rocco graduated from Bowdoin College in 2000 with a degree in English.

Career
La Rocco began her dance and theater critic career as a general arts writer for the Associated Press. Beginning in 2005, she joined The New York Times as their dance critic until 2013. She founded thePerformanceClub.org, which won a 2011 Creative Capital/Warhol Foundation Arts Writers Grant and focuses on criticism as a literary art form. She teaches at the School of Visual Arts MFA Art Criticism and Writing program.

Publications
 2014. The Best Most Useless Dress. Badlands Unlimited
 2015. I Don't Poem: An Anthology of Painters. Off the Park Press
 2015. Dancers, Buildings, People in the Streets. Danspace Project

References 

American dance critics
The New York Times writers
Living people
American women journalists
American women critics
Year of birth missing (living people)
21st-century American women